Samala Bhasker is a cinematographer and director in Indian Cinema, particularly Telugu films. He is a postgraduate at the Jawaharlal Nehru Architecture and Fine Arts University (JNAFAU), Hyderabad in Photography & Visual communication. His first film as a cinematographer was Sasirekha Parinayam directed by Pasupuleti Krishna Vamsi. 

After Sasirekha Parinayam, Bhasker worked mostly for different directors: Three (2008) with Sekhar Suri,  Ayyare (2012) with Saagar K Chandra,  Yedyanchi Jatra (2012) with Milind Zumber Kavde,  Popat (2013) with Satish Rajwade, 
Japam (2014) with M. S. Raju ,  Dongaata(2015) with Vamsi Krishna Naidu,       Raja Cheyyi Vesthe (2016) with Pradeep chilukuri,  W/O Ram (2018) with Vijay Yelakanti,  Mrs. Subbalakshmi (2019 Telugu web series) with Vamsi Krishna Naidu, Nenevaru (2022) with Nirnai Palanati,  Grandhalayam (2023) with Sai Sivan, Vairam (2023) with Sai Sivan,  Karmanye Vadhikaarastey (2023) with Amardeep Challapalli, and Hindi film Operation Fryday (2023) directed by Vishram Sawant. This was his first collaboration with Vishram Sawant in Hindi. He is presently working on a film with R. Samala and Stish Rajwade.

He made his Telugu debut with Sasirekha Parinayam (2008).

His Marathi debut was with Yedyanchi Jatra (2012).

He made his Hindi debut with film Shooter(2011) [later title changed to Operation Fryday) but its got released in (2023) Operation Fryday (2023).

Early and personal life
Samalabhasker is born and brought up in Warangal, Schooling in Singareni Collieries High School, Madaram, His father is a Singareni Collieries Company Limited retired employee and he is the middle of three siblings. He completed his Diploma Mechanical Engineering in 1996. He is postgraduate at the Jawaharlal Nehru Architecture and Fine Arts University (JNAFAU), Hyderabad Photography & Visual communication, Hyderabad. He is married to Soujanya on 29th April 2007. His two kids, daughter Aishwarya born in 2008 and Son Amartya born in 2013

Career
After his graduation from JNTU Photography & Visual Communication, he joined cinematographer Kabirlal as an assistant from Tujhe Meri Kasam (2003) and The Hero: Love Story of a Spy (2003). Then he joined K. K. Senthil Kumar as a chief associate from Sye' (2004), Chatrapathi (2005), Yamadonga (2007) and simultaneously worked with Sandeep Gunnam and  his close friend Sarvesh Murari for several films as a 2nd unit DOP. While working Arundhati (2009), he got an opportunity to work for the same film Arundhati as a Cinematographer. Then Krishna Vamsi choose Samalabhasker https://www.youtube.com/watch?v=6htejB6Lh0Q as the cinematographer for his film  Sasirekha Parinayam''.

Filmography

References

 https://www.youtube.com/watch?v=c2CiCLpPUx4
 https://vimeo.com/user29752238
 https://www.123telugu.com/reviews/wife-of-ram-telugu-movie-review.html
 https://www.123telugu.com/reviews/columbus-telugu-movie-review.html
 https://www.123telugu.com/reviews/dongaata-telugu-movie-review.html
 https://www.123telugu.com/reviews/review-ayyare-a-thought-provoking-movie.html

External links 
 Bhasker at IMDb

People from Warangal
Living people
Cinematographers from Telangana
Telugu film cinematographers
Filmfare Awards South winners
1975 births